So Dick On (born 4 February 2002) is a former Hong Kong professional footballer who played as a forward.

Club career
On 18 September 2020, So was promoted to the first team of Happy Valley.

On 14 August 2021, So joined Southern.

Career statistics

Club

Notes

References

External links

Living people
2002 births
Hong Kong footballers
Association football forwards
Hong Kong Premier League players
Happy Valley AA players
Southern District FC players